Jinyan Township is an rural township in Cili County, Hunan Province, People's Republic of China.

Administrative division
The township is divided into 19 villages, the following areas: Sanyuan Village, Luoyuan Village, Honglian Village, Yuetan Village, Baojian Village, Zhongping Village, Tuxi Village, Liuping Village, Chaping Village, Huping Village, Zhengping Village, Luofeng Village, Jinji Village, Jinpen Village, Nanyue Village, Nanping Village, Shuangzhong Village, Jinlong Village, and Minjia Village (三元村、落元村、红联村、月潭村、保健村、中坪村、土溪村、刘坪村、茶坪村、湖坪村、郑坪村、落丰村、金鸡村、金盆村、南岳村、南坪村、双中村、金龙村、敏家村)

References

Divisions of Cili County
Ethnic townships of the People's Republic of China
Townships of Hunan